West Blue may refer to one of the following:

 West Blue Mountain (New Mexico)
 West Blue Township, Adams County, Nebraska
 West Blue Township, Fillmore County, Nebraska
 The West Blue, a fictional sea in the manga series One Piece